Kurmanbek Saliyevich Bakiyev (Kurmanbek Saliyevich (Sali Uulu) Bakiyev; born 1 August 1949) is a Kyrgyz politician who served as the second President of Kyrgyzstan, from 2005 to 2010. Large opposition protests in April 2010 led to the takeover of government offices, forcing Bakiyev to flee the country.

Bakiyev was the leader of the People's Movement of Kyrgyzstan before his ascendance to the presidency. He received most of his popular support from the south of the country. The Legislative Assembly of Kyrgyzstan of the Supreme Council of Kyrgyzstan appointed him acting President on 25 March 2005, following the ousting, during the Tulip Revolution, of President Askar Akayev. In October 2007, Bakiyev initiated the creation of Ak Jol party, but could not lead it due to his presidency.

Early life and career
He was born on 1 August 1949 in the village of Masadan in the Jalal-Abad Region of the Kirghiz SSR. His father, Sali Bakiyev, was the chairman of a collective farm. In 1978, he graduated from the Kuibyshev Polytechnic Institute (now Samara State Technical University). In 1974, Bakiyev served in the ranks of the Soviet Army. In 1979, he moved to Jalal-Abad where, from 1979 to 1985, he worked at the plug-in connectors factory. Between 1990–91 he worked as the first secretary of the Kok-Yangak City Committee of the Communist Party of Kirghizia. Starting in 1995, he was the Governor of the Jalal-Abad Region, and Governor of the Chui Region. In December 2000, Bakiyev was appointed prime minister of Kyrgyzstan.

Presidency
Following the events of the 2005 Tulip Revolution, Bakiyev won the 10 July ballot for the Presidential election with 89% of the vote with a 53% turnout.

Despite initial hopes, Bakiyev's term in office was marred by the murder of several prominent politicians, prison riots, economic ills and battles for control of lucrative businesses.

In 2006, Bakiyev faced a political crisis as thousands of people participated in a series of protests in Bishkek. He was accused of not following through with his promises to limit presidential power, give more authority to parliament and the prime minister, and eradicate corruption and crime. Bakiyev claimed the opposition was plotting a coup against him.

In April 2007, the opposition held protests demanding Bakiyev's resignation, with a large protest beginning on 11 April in Bishkek. Bakiyev signed constitutional amendments to reduce his own power on 10 April but the protest went ahead, with protesters saying that they would remain until he resigned. Clashes broke out between protesters and police on 19 April, after which the protests ended.

During Bakiyev's presidency, the relationship between China and Kyrgyzstan strengthened, with increasing numbers of Chinese students in Kyrgyzstan. In February 2009, while in Moscow, Bakiyev announced the eviction of the US Air Base from Kyrgyzstan, following a meeting with Russian President Dmitry Medvedev, during which Russia promised a  investment.

Bakiyev was re-elected in the 2009 presidential election. After his re-election, he was presumed to deal with political and economic reform.

The Eurasia Daily Monitor wrote on 10 September 2009 that his style resembled other leaders such as Vladimir Putin and Nursultan Nazarbayev. Kyrgyz people were anxious about the risk of renewed power shortages and blackouts like in the winter 2008–2009. During the winter of 2010, the country suffered from rolling blackouts and cutoffs occurring regularly while energy prices have risen.

In January 2010, Kyrgyzstan sent a delegation to China to discuss improved economic relations.

Kyrgyzstan's national electric company, Natsionalnaya electricheskaya syet, and the Chinese Tebian Electric signed a  contract to build the Datka-Kemin 500 kv power transmission lines. This would have reduced Kyrgyzstan's dependence on the Central Asian power system. The delegation was led by Bakiyev's son.

In February 2010 Kyrgyzstan had to raise energy tariffs. Heating costs were reportedly going to rise 400 percent and electricity by 170 percent.

Russia backed his government until March 2010. The Eurasian Daily Monitor reported on 1 April that, for two weeks, the Kremlin had used the Russian mass media to run a negative campaign against Bakiyev. Russia controls much of the media in Kyrgyzstan. The sudden campaign coincided with Bakiyev's failure to carry out Russia's various demands related to things such as military bases.

On 1 April 2010, Russia also imposed duties on energy exports to Kyrgyzstan. It influenced fuel and transport prices immediately, and reportedly led to a massive protest in Talas on 6 April.

2010 revolution

In April 2010, after bloody riots in the capital overturned the government, Bakiyev reportedly fled to the southern city of Osh. The head of the new provisional government, Roza Otunbayeva, declared that Bakiyev had not resigned and was trying to rally support. When the revolt took place, Bakiyev was headed to the US for a series of meetings in Washington.

On 13 April 2010, Bakiyev stated he would be willing to resign the presidency if his security was guaranteed. On 15 April 2010, at 19:00, Bakiyev left Kyrgyzstan for Kazakhstan, having signed a resignation letter. Otunbayeva said she would press ahead to bring Bakiyev to trial.

On 20 April, the Belarusian president, Alexander Lukashenko told his parliament that "Bakiyev and his family, four people in all, have been in Minsk since Monday evening, as guests...Today they are here under the protection of our state, and personally of the president."

On 21 April, Bakiyev held a press conference in Minsk and stated "I, Kurmanbek Bakiyev, am the legally elected president of Kyrgyzstan and recognised by the international community. I do not recognise my resignation. Nine months ago the people of Kyrgyzstan elected me their president and there is no power that can stop me. Only death can stop me", and called Otunbayeva's administration an "illegitimate gang".

Parliamentary elections of 2010
Ata-Zhurt, a party campaigning for bringing Kurmanbek Bakiyev back to power, won 28 out of 120 seats in Kyrgyzstan's parliamentary elections of 2010, securing a narrow plurality over the other parties.

Exile in Minsk
In Kyrgyzstan, Bakiev was sentenced in absentia to life in prison for involvement in the killing of protesters during the 2010 uprising. The Kyrgyz government has since demanded Bakiyev's extradition, but Belarus has refused, which has been the cause of many conflicts in Kyrgyz-Belarusian relations. He was accompanied by his wife Tatyana, his two sons and his Kyrgyz mistress Nazgul Tolomusheva. In February 2012, it was being reported that Bakiyev was granted Belarusian citizenship in 2010. In a 2017 interview with the Belarusian service of Radio Free Europe/Radio Liberty, Bakiyev claimed that Medvedev and Putin, as well as US President Barack Obama were involved in the coordination of his safe departure to Minsk.

In February 2019, the United States Treasury announced the return of over $4 million stolen by Bakiyev to the Kyrgyzstan's Government. On 6 August 2019, Bakiyev met with President Alexander Lukashenko in the Independence Palace to mark Bakiyev's 70th birthday, which he had marked several days earlier. Lukashenko presented Bakiyev with traditional flowers and symbolic gifts before meeting with him in his office where they discussed relevant issues. The meeting angered the Kyrgyz Foreign Ministry, which stated the next day that it "fundamentally does not meet the principles of friendship and cooperation between the two countries". In July 2021, Bakiyev was put on the wanted list, he is accused of corruption in the development of the Kumtor gold deposit.

Family and private life
Bakiyev's wife, Tatyana Vasilevna Petrova (Russian: Татьяна Васильевна Бакиева), a production engineer, is an ethnic Russian who was born in Samara and raised in what is present-day Moldova.

During his time as president, several Bakiyev family members had prominent positions in the government, with at least five close relatives working in the upper echelons of power. His brother Janysh was head of the presidential guard. Another brother Marat was Kyrgyzstan's ambassador to Germany. Another brother, Adyl, was an adviser to Kyrgyzstan's ambassador to China.

Since the overthrow, Kurmanbek's younger son, Maksim, was charged with embezzlement and abuse of power by the interim government. It is suspected that he transferred about $35 million of a $300 million loan from Russia into his private bank accounts.

Apart from Kyrgyz, he speaks Russian and Uzbek.

From his common-law wife Bakieva Nazgul Tolomusheva Kurmanbek Bakiev has a son Daniyar born in 2005 and a daughter Leyla born in 2000. On January 15, 2023, Bakieva Nazgul died of heart failure.

Awards 

 Order of the Olympic Council of Asia (2009)
 Order of the Commonwealth
 Order of Friendship of Peoples (Belarus, 2014)

References

External links

Official Website of Kurmanbek Bakiyev
Presidential biography
Previous Constitution of Kyrgyzstan
Xinhua profile
"Kyrgyzstan, Uzbekistan Sign Economic Cooperation Treaty"
Kyrgyzstan on the Edge
Kyrgyz President Replaces Renegade Regional Governor

|-

|-

|-

1949 births
Ak Jol politicians
Kyrgyzstani exiles
Kyrgyzstani Sunni Muslims
Living people
People from Jalal-Abad Region
Presidents of Kyrgyzstan
Prime Ministers of Kyrgyzstan
Kyrgyzstani emigrants to Belarus
Leaders ousted by a coup
Kyrgyz Revolution of 2010